Wubanoides is a genus of sheet weavers that was first described by K. Y. Eskov in 1986.

Species
 it contains only two species and one subspecies:
Wubanoides fissus (Kulczyński, 1926) – Russia, Japan
Wubanoides uralensis (Pakhorukov, 1981) – Russia, Mongolia
Wubanoides uralensis lithodytes Schikora, 2004 – Central, Eastern Europe

See also
 List of Linyphiidae species (Q–Z)

References

Araneomorphae genera
Linyphiidae
Spiders of Asia